Paul Gardner is an American writer and filmmaker living in New York City.

Background 
Gardner grew up in Pasadena and Los Angeles. He attended the University of California, Berkeley, and graduated from the College of William & Mary in Virginia.

Career 
Gardner was on staff of The New York Times for seven years as a writer-critic and assistant editor of Sunday Arts & Leisure. In Paris, where he lived for over three years, he contributed theatre and film reviews to the Financial Times of London and worked on film projects with director Claude Chabrol, co-scripting Chabrol's Ten Days' Wonder (film) (La Décade prodigieuse), which starred Orson Welles and Anthony Perkins.

He published a William Faulkner portrait published in A Faulkner Perspective for the Franklin Library; Lynn, the memoirs of Royal Ballet star Lynn Seymour; Brooklyn: People and Places, Past and Present, a socio-cultural history of the famous borough; and Louise Bourgeois, a personal journey into the life of the acclaimed sculptor. Writing for a variety of periodicals, Gardner interviewed subjects as diverse as the Beatles (on their first visit to the U.S.A.), Howard Hawks in Palm Springs, and Leni Riefenstahl in Pöcking, Bayern.

A founding board member of the Delaware Theatre Company, Gardner helped launch the state's first regional theatre in Wilmington.
 
He co-produced the Art City series of three contemporary art documentaries featuring artists Brice Marden, Elizabeth Murray (artist), Agnes Martin, and Neil Jenney, among others; and the visual profile, Richard Tuttle: Never Not an Artist. The films have been shown at festivals in Toronto, Montréal, Paris, and Naples, as well as at art museums throughout the world.

Bibliography

Books 

Lynn : The Autobiography of Lynn Seymour. London : Granada Publishing Ltd., 1984.
Brooklyn : People and Places, Past and Present (with Grace Glueck). New York : Harry N. Abrams, 1991.
Louise Bourgeois. New York : Rizzoli, 1994.

Selected essays, articles, and other works 
"The French They Are a Movie Race", The New York Times, May 18, 1969 
"Faulkner Remembered", A Faulkner Perspective. Franklin Center, Pennsylvania : The Franklin Library, 1976
"My Night with Rohmer", New York, November 8, 1976
"Sometimes, Nothing Succeeds Like a Flop", The New York Times, September 16, 1977 
"Think of Leonardo Wielding a Pixel and a Mouse", The New York Times, April 22, 1984 
"Leni Riefenstahl", Vanity Fair, July 1984 
"Chuck Close : Making the Impossible Possible", ArtNews, May 1992
"The Houses That Louise Built", HG, October 1992
"Chamber Music Barges in on the Brooklyn Docks", The Smithsonian, January 1994
"Neil Jenney: Scary Territory", ArtNews, January 1996
"When France Was Home to African-American Artists", The Smithsonian, March 1996 
"Music to the Eyes", Harper's Bazaar, April 1996
"Carl Van Vechten, Culture Connoisseur", On Paper : The Journal of Prints, Drawings and Photography, May–June 1998
"Auction Signals," ArtNews, October 1998 
"Neil Jenney : The Bad Years 1969-70", Exhibit Catalogue, Gagosian Gallery, New York City, 2001
"Renaissance Men by the Letter", The Nation, July 2, 2001 https://www.thenation.com/article/renaissance-men-letter/
"Richard Tuttle: Odd Man In", ArtNews, April 2004

Filmography

As co-writer 
Ten Days' Wonder (film) (1971)

As co-producer 

Art City 1 : Making It in Manhattan (1996)
Art City 2 : Simplicity (2002)
Art City 3 : A Ruling Passion (2002)
Richard Tuttle : Never Not an Artist (2005)

References

Additional sources 

Alan Wells, editor. Mass Media and Society (Third Edition). California : Mayfield Publishing Company, 1979.
Deborah Jowitt. Jerome Robbins : His Life, His Theater, His Dance. New York : Simon & Schuster, 2004.
Mel Gussow. Edward Albee : A Singular Journey. New York : Applause, 2001.
Arthur Gelb. The City Room. New York : G.P. Putnam's Sons, 2003.
Alice Goldfarb Marquis. The Pop Revolution. Boston : MFA Publishing, 2010.

American documentary film producers
Living people
Year of birth missing (living people)